Frank Mariano Tejeda (October 2, 1945 – January 30, 1997) was a decorated United States Marine and an American Democratic politician from Texas. He served in the Texas House of Representatives (1976–1987), the Texas Senate (1987–1993), and in the United States House of Representatives (1993–1997).

Biography
Frank M. Tejeda was born in San Antonio, Texas. He attended St. Leo's Catholic School and graduated from Harlandale High School.

He served in the United States Marine Corps and was wounded in action during the Vietnam War (1963–1967). He was decorated for valor with the Silver Star, the Bronze Star, and the Purple Heart. Tejeda reached the rank of major in the Marine Corps Reserve.

After his Marine Corps service, he earned his bachelor's degree in 1970 from St. Mary's University in San Antonio, and his J.D. in 1974 from University of California, Berkeley Law School.

Tejeda began his political career in the Texas Legislature. He served in the Texas House from 1976 to 1987, and then in the Texas Senate from 1987 to 1993. While serving in the legislature, he earned two master's degrees — in 1980, he received an M.A. from Harvard University, and in 1989, an LL.M. from Yale Law School.

Tejeda was elected with 87% of the votes to the U.S. Congress in 1992, representing the 28th Congressional District of Texas. Notably, serving on the Armed Services Committee and the Veterans' Affairs Committee, his work in the Congress focused on veterans' issues.

On January 30, 1997, shortly after the beginning of his third term, Congressman Tejeda died from pneumonia after a year-long battle with brain cancer. He was buried with full military honors at Fort Sam Houston National Cemetery in San Antonio.

Namesakes
On September 1, 1997, U.S. Highway 281 from Interstate 410 to the Atascosa/Bexar county line was named "Congressman Frank M. Tejeda Memorial Highway" by the Texas Legislature
A charter high school with his name, Frank Tejeda Academy, in the Harlandale Independent School District in San Antonio, the same district in which he lived and from which he graduated.
The Frank M. Tejeda Post Office Building in San Antonio, dedicated in 1997.
The VA outpatient clinic in San Antonio was posthumously named in his honor.
Frank Tejeda Estates, a housing development at Lackland Air Force Base.
Frank Tejeda Middle School in the North East Independent School District in San Antonio was posthumously named in his honor.
Division Park in the City of San Antonio was renamed Frank Tejeda Park in 1996.
The Texas State Veterans Home in Floresville, Texas is named in memory of Rep. Tejeda.
After his death, the Marine Corps Reserve Association created the Major Frank M. Tejeda Leadership Award to recognize leaders committed to the Marine Corps.

See also

List of notable brain tumor patients
List of Hispanic and Latino Americans in the United States Congress
List of United States Congress members who died in office (1950–99)

Notes

References
 Retrieved on 2008-02-02

External links

1945 births
1997 deaths
Harvard University alumni
Hispanic and Latino American state legislators in Texas
Democratic Party members of the Texas House of Representatives
Military personnel from San Antonio
Democratic Party Texas state senators
United States Marine Corps personnel of the Vietnam War
United States Marine Corps reservists
United States Marine Corps officers
Harlandale High School alumni
St. Mary's University, Texas alumni
UC Berkeley School of Law alumni
Yale Law School alumni
Burials at Fort Sam Houston National Cemetery
Recipients of the Silver Star
Democratic Party members of the United States House of Representatives from Texas
Deaths from cancer in Texas
Deaths from brain cancer in the United States
20th-century American politicians